The New Mexico Motor Vehicle Division (MVD) is a state-level government agency based in Santa Fe, New Mexico. The MVD operates 32 field offices across the state, along with 39 contracted offices through local municipalities. The agency is responsible for issuing driver licenses and vehicle registration. The MVD is a division of the New Mexico Taxation and Revenue Department.

See also

Department of Motor Vehicles
New Mexico Taxation and Revenue Department
Government of New Mexico

References

External links
 Motor Vehicle Division

State agencies of New Mexico
Transportation in New Mexico